The 2006 Asian Artistic Gymnastics Championships were the 3rd edition of the Asian Artistic Gymnastics Championships, and were held in Surat, India from 30 July to 3 August 2006.

Medal summary

Men

Women

Medal table

Participating nations 
105 athletes from 19 nations competed.

 (4)
 (8)
 (6)
 (5)
 (8)
 (4)
 (8)
 (3)
 (4)
 (3)
 (5)
 (8)
 (1)
 (8)
 (8)
 (2)
 (6)
 (8)
 (6)

References

External links
 Men's Results
 Women's Results

A
Asian Gymnastics Championships
Asian Gymnastics Championships
International gymnastics competitions hosted by India